The Rahara Ramakrishna Mission Boys' Home High School is a higher secondary school in Rahara, Khardaha, West Bengal, India. The school was opened in 1949, five years after its foundation. The school is run by the Rahara Ramakrishna Mission Boys' Home Authority under the guidance of Ramakrishna Mission at Belur Math. It is affiliated to the West Bengal Board of Secondary Education and West Bengal Council of Higher Secondary Education.

History
Initially, the boys' home was founded on 1 September 1944, by Swami Punyananda, as an orphanage with a nuclear family of 37 boys, rendered orphan by the Great Famine of Bengal in 1942-1943. The school obtained recognition as a High School from the Calcutta University in January 1949. From 1957, it was upgraded to a Higher Secondary Multipurpose School with four streams, viz. Humanities, Science, Technical and Commerce. It has been sending up candidates for the Madhyamik Pariksha of the West Bengal Board of Secondary Education since 1976 under the new pattern of Secondary Education.

In 1963, the Government of India selected it as one of the model multipurpose schools in the state.

Current situation
Students of this school have glorified the name of school by scoring good marks in national and state level competitive examinations. Many students have cracked JEE-Mains, JEE-Advanced, NEET, KVPY, WBJEE, ISI Exams etc.Sahitagni Chatterjee has ranked(state) 5th in HS 2019 , Sayan Banerjee has ranked(state) 6th in 2019 HS . Panchajanya Dey had ranked (state)1st in WBJEE 2021 . Aritra Maity had ranked (state) 6th in HS 2022 & ranked(state) 3rd in Madhyamik 2020 . Every year students crack various compititive exams in national level from this school. 

This school has won best school award of year for 2 times from Government of West Bengal.

See also
 List of Ramakrishna Mission institutions
 Ramakrishna Mission Vivekananda Centenary College

References

External links
 Official website
 Official Alumni Association page

Boarding schools in West Bengal
Boys' schools in India
High schools and secondary schools in West Bengal
Schools affiliated with the Ramakrishna Mission
Schools in North 24 Parganas district
Educational institutions established in 1949
1949 establishments in West Bengal